The 2013–14 Mount St. Mary's Mountaineers men's basketball team represented Mount St. Mary's University during the 2013–14 NCAA Division I men's basketball season. The Mountaineers, led by second year head coach Jamion Christian, played their home games at Knott Arena and were members of the Northeast Conference. They finished the season 16–17, 9–7 in NEC play to finish in a tie for fourth place. They were champions of the NEC tournament to earn an automatic bid to the NCAA tournament where they lost in the First Four to Albany.

Roster

Schedule

|-
!colspan=9 style="background:#005596; color:#A29161;"| Regular season

|-
!colspan=9 style="background:#005596; color:#A29161;"| Northeast Conference tournament

|-
!colspan=9 style="background:#005596; color:#A29161;"| NCAA tournament

References

Mount St. Mary's Mountaineers men's basketball seasons
Mount St. Mary's
Mount St. Mary's
Mount
Mount